Vishnuswami was a Hindu religious leader. He is primarily known for having started the Rudra sampradaya.

References

Medieval Hindu religious leaders
Vaishnavism
600 BC births

Devotees in vishnu swami sampradaya
1)gyan dev
2)trilochan ji
3) vallabhachary ji

Vallabhachary wrote anubhashya on bramh sutra

Vishnu swami is founder acharya of his sampradaya and known as rudra sampradaya. He got rudra sampradaya parampara from lord Shiva. Afterwards it was called vishnuswami sampradaya. And when Vallabhachaya became Acharya its name changed to [pushtimarg] or [vallabh sampraday. Vishnu swami continued his tradition by making [[bilvamangalacharya the next vishnu swami of sampradaya. According to legends, He told bilvamangal that you would not die until the god himself appears in this tradition. After a wait of 4000 years finally god appeared after the 100th yagna, He appeared as mahaprabhu vallabhacharya in 15th century. Vallabhacharya mahaprabhu was third vishnuswami of tradition. Today also this tradition is carried from generations to generations, in the lineage of vallabhacharya mahaprabhu. The present day Vishnuswami is the 16th descendant of Jagadguru shri vallabhacharya HH P.Pu shashthapithadhishwar Goswami shri Vallabhraiji Maharaj.